Cerros Negros de Jama is a monogenetic volcanic group in the Andes, Jujuy Province, Argentina. These cones are aligned submeridionally with a fault system in the ground. The lavas and associated dykes have porphyritic appearance and variable morphology. The lavas show no evidence of ponding in crustal magma chambers, suggesting that the large volatile content of the magma was sufficient to quickly transport it through the crust.

Arenite of sedimentary origin and dacite are found as xenoliths. The cones were presumably built by Strombolian activity with occasional Hawaiian episodes. 

In two of the cones were erupted at the base of the cones by dykes. In the northernmost cone, two northeastern lava flows were erupted above each other. The lower flow ( wide and long) is thinner and contains pyroxene phenocrysts, the upper one has a smaller extent ( long) and is dominated by olivine. On its western margin, it borders a lineament that cuts through the cones.

Two other lava fields are also present. Two lava flows at Cerro El Chileno extend  southeastward and are associated with pyroclastic mounds, suggesting some explosive activity, but no cone.

The volcanic field is located in the Puna-Altiplano highland, a region with strong tectonic and volcanic activity since the Oligocene. Changes in subduction style of the Nazca plate have produced changes in the nature and amount of volcanic activity, with the latest change being a westward shift of volcanic activity to the main belt of the Central Volcanic Zone. In the region, mafic volcanism has been active since the Oligocene. Most volcanism in the area is of silicic nature however.

References 

Monogenetic volcanic fields
Volcanoes of Jujuy Province
Volcanic fields